Buscando a Casal is a 2019 Cuban drama film directed by Jorge Luis Sánchez. It was selected as the Cuban entry for the Best International Feature Film at the 93rd Academy Awards, but it was not nominated.

Cast
 Yasmani Guerrero as Julián del Casal
 Yadier Fernández
 Blanca Rosa Blanco
 Armando Miguel Gómez
 Marlon López

See also
 List of submissions to the 93rd Academy Awards for Best International Feature Film
 List of Cuban submissions for the Academy Award for Best International Feature Film

References

External links
 

2019 films
2019 drama films
Cuban drama films
2010s Spanish-language films